The Kawasan Falls are multi-layered waterfalls on the River Kawasan in Badian, Cebu, in the Philippines. The water for the Kawasan Falls comes from the Kabukalan Spring and passes through the Kawasan gorge en route to the Matutinao River and the Tanon Strait. There are two main waterfalls, one over 40 metres in height, the second 20 metres high but wider, both plunging into turquoise water pools.

References 

Waterfalls of the Philippines
Tourist attractions in Cebu